NGC 204 is an unbarred lenticular galaxy located approximately 241 million light-years from the Solar System in the constellation Pisces. It was discovered on December 21, 1786 by William Herschel.

See also 
 List of NGC objects (1–1000)

References

External links 
 
 
 SEDS

0204
Unbarred lenticular galaxies
Pisces (constellation)
2397
Astronomical objects discovered in 1786
Discoveries by William Herschel